Suchogorgon is an extinct genus of gorgonopsids from Russia. It was a medium-sized animal with a low, narrow skull. Its skull is dotted with small pits, which might have housed sensory organs in life. Its canines were large and flat as in most gorgonopsids.

References 

Gorgonopsia
Prehistoric therapsid genera
Fossils of Russia